Garnik Avalyan (born 6 September 1962) is an Armenian and Russian football coach and a retired striker. He was a member of the Armenia national team, and has participated in 6 international matches and scored 2 goals since his debut in an away 1998 FIFA World Cup qualification match against Portugal on 20 August 1997.

International goals

External links

1962 births
People from Ijevan
Living people
Armenian footballers
Armenia international footballers
Armenian expatriate footballers
PFC Krylia Sovetov Samara players
FC Shinnik Yaroslavl players
FC Elista players
Russian footballers
Russian Premier League players
Armenian football managers
FC Volgar Astrakhan players
FC Ryazan managers
Russian football managers
Association football forwards
FC Iskra Smolensk players